The family Fulgoridae is a large group of hemipteran insects, especially abundant and diverse in the tropics, containing over 125 genera worldwide. They are mostly of moderate to large size, many with a superficial resemblance to Lepidoptera due to their brilliant and varied coloration. Various genera and species (especially the genera Fulgora and Pyrops) are sometimes referred to as lanternflies or lanthorn flies, though they do not emit light.

The head of some species is produced into a hollow process, resembling a snout, which is sometimes inflated and nearly as large as the body of the insect, sometimes elongated, narrow and apically upturned. It was believed, mainly on the authority of Maria Sibylla Merian, that this process, the so-called lantern, was luminous at night in the living insect. Carl Linnaeus adopted the statement without question and coined a number of specific names, such as laternaria, phosphorea and candelaria to illustrate the supposed fact, and thus propagated the myth.

Taxonomy
Metcalf in 1938, as amended in 1947, recognized five subfamilies (Amyclinae, Aphaeninae, Fulgorinae, Phenacinae, and Poiocerinae) and twelve tribes in the Fulgoridae. By 1963 Lallemand had divided the Fulgoridae into eight subfamilies (Amyclinae, Aphaeninae, Enchophorinae, Fulgorinae, Phenacinae, Poiocerinae, Xosopharinae and Zanninae) and eleven tribes. This classification was generally accepted.

However, in 2008 Julie Urban's molecular analysis in her dissertation showed that a significant revamping of fulgorid subfamilies and tribes would be necessary, as the morphological analysis by itself did not take into account the complexity of fulgorid evolution. Her work was recapitulated in 2009 with Jason Cryan. The Zanninae may not even be in the Fulgoridae.

Subfamilies and Selected Genera

The NCBI and the Hemiptera Database currently include to the following sub-families and genera (lists complete if subfamily not linked):

Notes: 
 Laternaria is a nomen nudum of Pyrops
 Pyrilla Stål, 1859 is now placed in the Lophopidae
 The type species of genus Apossoda, A. togoensis Schmidt, 1911 is now placed as Pyrgoteles togoensis (Schmidt, 1911)

Gallery

References

Sources
 T. Porion, 1994 - Fulgoridae 1. Illustrated Catalogue of the American Fauna , Sciences Nat, Venette, 72 pages, 14 plates in colours
 T. Porion & P. Bleuzen, 2004 - Fulgoridae 1. Supplement 1. New Neotropical Fulgoridae , Hillside Books, Canterbury, 22 pages, 4 plates in colours
 T. Porion & S. Nagai, 1996 - Fulgoridae 2. Illustrated Catalogue of the Asian and Australian Fauna , Sciences Nat, Venette, 80 p., 20 plates in colours (Suppl. 1 , Suppl. 2 )

External links

How to Make Homemade Lantern Fly Spray?

 
Auchenorrhyncha families